Prem Menon (born 15 October 1953) is an Indian businessman, former actor and director, who has appeared in Tamil films. He became known with his role in the film Krodham (1982) and has since regularly produced and made his own projects.

Career
Prem Kumar Menon is the son of entrepreneur K. T. B. Menon, who had vast business interests and investments in Kuwait. Prem Menon heads company Laksola, which produces insulating materials, and his financial success prompted him to pursue other interests in Tamil films. He has subsequently worked in the film industry as an actor director, screenwriter and producer, specialising in making action-thriller films. He made a breakthrough in films by producing and starring in A. Jagannathan's Krodham (1982), before helming and playing the lead role in a series of action films in the early 1990s including Vetri Karangal (1991) and Veeramani (1994). In 2000, Prem directed and featured in a sequel to Krodham titled Krodham 2, winning mixed reviews for his work. An action-thriller, the film featured Prem alongside Radhika Chaudhari and Khushbu, a critic wrote "the action tapers into melodrama and tedium".

He made a comeback by writing, directing and producing the thriller film Ashoka (2008) portraying a security guard, and it garnered average reviews and had a low key release at the box office. The film featured no songs or a separate comedy track, and won media recognition for being a rare Tamil film during the period to have neither of those elements. Prem then began work on Vazhipokkan, a village-centric action film,  in 2009 but the film was eventually shelved.

Filmography

References

External links

Living people
Male actors in Tamil cinema
20th-century Indian male actors
Male actors from Tamil Nadu
Tamil film directors
20th-century Indian film directors
Tamil screenwriters
Screenwriters from Tamil Nadu
Film directors from Tamil Nadu
1953 births